The Far East East Region was one of four international regions that competed in the Little League World Series from 1962 to 2000. Far East qualifiers won a record 23 titles — 17 from Taiwan, four from Japan, and two from the Republic of Korea.

Teams from East Asia were first allowed to qualify for the Little League World Series in 1961. A team from Japan lost to Hawaii in the original Pacific Region's qualifying game. The following year the Far East Region was created, with the Japanese champion receiving an automatic berth in the World Series. The first multinational Far East Regional Tournament took place in 1969 and featured six countries.

In 2001, the Little League World Series was expanded to sixteen teams. The Far East was split into two regions – the Pacific (consisting of teams from the Pacific Islands, Indonesia, and Oceania) and Asia (consisting of teams from mainland Asia). Originally, Japan was to become its own region. In , the regions were again reconfigured to match the original plan. Japan was given an automatic berth in the Series, while the remaining Asian teams merged with the Pacific teams to create the Asia-Pacific Region.

Far East Region countries

Controversies

1975 ban
From 1972 to 1974, Taiwan dominated the LLWS, outscoring their opponents 112–2. In , they did not allow a hit.

On November 11, 1974, Little League Baseball announced that all non-US teams were banned from competing in the Little League World Series. Initially, travel costs and nationalism were the reasons given. But, many made the connection to the success of the Far East teams. A representative of the Taiwanese Baseball Association also read between the lines, "We are suffering from a strange phenomenon, we are too good."

Several months later, Little League Baseball did give a more detailed reason for the ban. "There was too much emphasis on this particular age group, and this happened in Latin America, as well as the Far East and other places in which it became a more Olympic type activity.

Despite being banned from the Little League World Series, international leagues still held regional championships. In the 1975 Far East Tournament, Taiwan defeated Japan in a controversial contest. The ban was only limited to the Little League division. International teams could still compete at the Senior and Big League World Series. Taiwan would win both of those tournaments, the Far East hegemony encompassed each level of youth baseball.

In December 1975, the international ban was repealed with a 12–1 vote. The decision came with a caveat; the tournament would now be split into two brackets. One side for the U.S. teams, and the other for the internationals. This would give the U.S. a 50/50 chance of winning the championship every year, but it also made the road easier for the Far East and Latin America teams. The four international regions—Canada, Europe, Far East, and Latin America—were not all at the same skill level. The lesser skill levels of the Canada Region and Europe Region teams therefore turned the international side into a foregone conclusion; the Far East Region or Latin America Region champion would make the final game every year that followed the bracket split.

1992 Zamboanga City disqualification 
For the first time ever, a team from the Philippines won the Far East Region tournament. The team headed to Williamsport and advanced to the final. The championship game, against Long Beach, California, was a blowout, with Zamboanga City winning, 15-4, after a 7-run first inning.  The team was hailed as heroes in the Philippines, with President Ramos giving the team a gift of 1 million pesos to contribute to the livelihood of their families.  Long Beach head coach Jeff Burroughs remarked that semi-final pitcher Roberto Placious had the poise of a high school or college pitcher.

There had been some suspicions about the Zamboanaga City team soon after it arrived in Williamsport.  Several committee members didn't think the manager and coach seemed "typical."  However, nothing more came of it after assurances were given that the manager and coach were from the same league as the players and had coached in that league during the regular season.  A few days after Zamboanga City's triumphant victory, however, journalist Al Mendoza of the Philippine Daily Inquirer began publishing stories suggesting that some players were ineligible.  He'd received letters from several neighbors and relatives claiming that several players were too old for Little League.  Local administrator Armando Andaya was faxed four questions from Little League president Creighton Hale, regarding player ages, birth certificates, residence, and a specific question regarding winning championship game pitcher Ian Tolentino's participation in a tournament in 1990 (possibly with the view of suggesting this would have made him over-age). Andaya admitted to violating rules on district representation - eight players were from outside the Zamboanga City area, some as far away as Luzon, and unable to speak Chabacano, the language most commonly spoken in Zamboanga. Andaya claimed that the eight players replaced, for various reasons, were unable to go to China for the Far East series and that the out-of-district substitutes were only used to make up numbers rather than to give the team an extra edge over their opponents.  He also admitted that the team's original coach had been replaced with someone from Manila.

Little League Baseball stripped Zamboanga City of its title.  Under Little League rules at the time, when a team was found to have used an ineligible player, it forfeited only its most recent game (otherwise they would have to put the entire tournament on hold while the teams that lost to the illegal team were put back into the tournament).  Since the revelation was made after the championship game, that game was declared a 6-0 forfeit victory by Long Beach, which was awarded the championship. The exposed players and parents remained defiant, and accused Little League Baseball of denying them due process.

With many Filipinos outraged at what they saw as an unpatriotic betrayal by Mendoza, who was given the key to the city of Long Beach, fellow Inquirer journalist Armand N. Nocum conducted further investigation 
and found that even the six true Zamboangueños were over-age, including at least two as old as 15, and thus ineligible. It was discovered that, as with the eight non-district players, the fraud had been maintained by the players' assumption of identities of (eligible) players who had represented the city at the national championships, the families of whom were reportedly willing to reveal all, jealous of the prizes bestowed upon the players who had used their sons' identities to represent their country at the Far East and World Series. In some cases, even the parents of the ineligible players assumed appropriate identities to maintain the appearance of propriety. Nocum, a native of the area, had not wanted to believe such an egregious fraud was taking place, but discovered that even school officials were in on the cover-up.  Later, Nocum, seemingly backing Andaya's assertion that the substitutes were not chosen to artificially inflate the team's performance, told Sports Illustrated that had the original Zamboanga City team participated in the World Series, they would have trounced Long Beach by at least 30-4.

In an interesting post-script, Zamboanga City was disqualified from the Filipino national titles the very next year in another over-age player scandal.

1993 Far East Tournament
Following the Zamboanga City scandal, Little League announced that they would be enforcing boundary and age limits more strictly. At the 1993 Far East Tournament Taiwan defeated Japan to claim yet another berth in Williamsport. South Korea and China rounded out the top 4. The World Series berth, however, was given to the fifth place team from Saipan, Northern Mariana Islands. The top 4 had all failed to meet the new rule requirements and were disqualified. The team from Saipan went 1–2 in Williamsport, making it the first time since 1970 that Far East Champion did not make the semifinals.

The Latin America champion from the Dominican Republic was also disqualified under similar circumstances.

Taiwan leaves Little League
In April 1997, the Taiwan Baseball Association decided that its youth baseball programs would no longer affiliate with Little League. “The leagues in Taiwan were unable at that time to adhere to certain Little League rules and regulations regarding residency, and the area from which a single chartered league could draw its players,” said Stephen D. Keener, president and chief executive officer of Little League Baseball.

Taiwan would re-join Little League in 2003, their best finish in the LLWS since returning is Runner-Up in 2009.

Far East Champions in the Little League World Series

LLWS results by country
The following table lists each country's record in the Little League World Series.

Milestones
23 overall championships
10 straight championships (1971–1981)
34 game winning streak  (1970–1982)

See also
Asia-Pacific Region in other Little League baseball divisions:
Little League
Asia-Pacific & Middle East
Japan
Intermediate League
Junior League
Senior League
Big League

Notes
 In 1975 Little League Banned all International teams from competing at the World Series. The dominance of the Far East was a contributing factor.
 Zamboanga City, Philippines appeared in the 1992 Little League World Series, winning the championship, but were disqualified after the completion of the tournament when it was revealed that several players did not meet eligibility requirements regarding age and residency.
 The 1993 Far East Championship was won by a team from Taiwan, but they were disqualified from the Little League World Series for breaking rules regarding age and residency requirements. Taiwan was replaced by a team from Saipan, which went 1–2 and tied for fifth place.

References

External links
 Little League Online

Far
Baseball leagues in Asia
Asian international sports competitions